The Latin Church Catholic Diocese of Hamilton, New Zealand is  a suffragan diocese of the Roman Catholic Archdiocese of Wellington. It is centred in Hamilton, New Zealand and was formed on 6 March 1980 from a portion of the territory in the Diocese of Auckland. The Cathedral of the Diocese is the Cathedral of the Blessed Virgin Mary.

Ordinaries of Hamilton, New Zealand

Other Bishops

Auxiliary bishop
Max Takuira Matthew Mariu SM (1952-2005), Auxiliary Bishop here (1988-2005)

Other priest of this diocese who became bishop
Michael Andrew Gielen (1971-), priest here (1997-2020), appointed Auxiliary Bishop of Auckland (2 January 2020)

Secondary schools

 Aquinas College, Tauranga
 Campion College, Gisborne
 John Paul College, Rotorua
 Sacred Heart Girls' College, Hamilton
 St John's College, Hamilton

See also
 Holy Cross Seminary
 Holy Name Seminary
 Roman Catholicism in New Zealand
 List of New Zealand Catholic bishops

External links and references
Catholic Diocese of Hamilton in New Zealand

Hamilton in New Zealand